The  is a Japanese DC electric multiple unit (EMU) commuter train type operated by the private railway operator Tobu Railway on Tobu Urban Park Line services since June 2013.

Overview
The first two six-car sets were introduced on the 62.7 km Tobu Noda Line from 15 June 2013, replacing older 8000 series sets. A further six sets (36 vehicles) were introduced during fiscal 2013.

Based on the 50000 series EMUs first introduced in 2004, the 60000 series have aluminium alloy bodies with a double-skin construction manufactured using friction stir welding (FSW). The trains feature VVVF control, and use fully enclosed motors reducing environmental noise.

Externally, the front ends and upper bodysides are finished in "future blue", the colour used for the Tobu corporate logo, and "bright green" highlights are used on either side of the doors.

Formation
, the fleet consists of 18 six-car sets based at Nanakodai Depot. Trainsets consist of three motored (M) cars and three unpowered trailer (T) cars, and are formed as shown below with the Tc1 cars at the Kashiwa end.

The M1 and M3 cars each have one PT7112-B single-arm pantograph. Car 4 is designated as a mildly air-conditioned car.

Interior
Internally, the trains use LED lighting throughout, with the illumination level capable of being adjusted to 100%, 50%, or 25% brightness. LCD passenger information displays are provided above the doors, and a Wi-Fi service is provided – for the first time on Tobu Railway trains.

Wheelchair spaces are provided at one end of each of the four intermediate cars.

The glass panels on the doors separating each car are decorated with designs depicting the five different "city flowers" of the eight cities served by the Noda Line: cherry blossom (Saitama), wysteria (Kasukabe), sunflower (Kashiwa and Funabashi), rhododendron (Noda, Nagareyama, Matsudo), and Japanese bellflower (Kamagaya).

History
The first two sets, 61601 and 61602, were delivered from the Hitachi factory in Kudamatsu, Yamaguchi in March 2013. Set 61601 entered revenue service on 15 June 2013, with 61602 entering service on 21 June 2013. Sets 61603 and 61604 were delivered together from Hitachi in January 2014, both entering revenue service from 27 January 2014.

Fleet history
The fleet history details are as shown below.

References

External links

 Tobu 60000 series information 

Electric multiple units of Japan
60000 series
Train-related introductions in 2013
Hitachi multiple units
1500 V DC multiple units of Japan